The Mickey Finn is a historic and effective bucktail streamer used by fly anglers for trout, warm-water and saltwater species.  The fly is somewhat generic and imitates a wide variety of baitfish.  Although most likely originated in the late 19th century by Eastern Canadian anglers, the Mickey Finn pattern once known as the Red and yellow bucktail was popularized by angler and author John Alden Knight in 1937.

In  The History of Fly Fishing in Fifty Flies  (2015), Ian Whitelaw writes:

Origin
The Mickey Finn originated in Eastern Canada in the late 19th century and was known as the Red and Yellow Bucktail.  In Streamer Fly Tying and Fishing (1950), Joseph D. Bates Jr. relates the story of the Mickey Finn.

John Alden Knight went on to explain the naming of the Mickey Finn:

Imitates
The Mickey Finn is an attractor style streamer that imitates no particular baitfish.  Depending on it size it is suggestive of a wide variety of baitfish commonly found in both freshwater and saltwater environments.

Materials
 Hook: 4X Streamer 2/0-8
 Thread: Black 6/0
 Body: Silver tinsel or mylar
 Rib: Silver oval tinsel or wire
 Wing: Red and yellow bucktail
 Head: Black

Variations
 Mickey Finn Marabou
 Mickey Finn Synthetic
 Mickey Finn Jungle Cock

Notes

 
Streamer patterns